Five Mile Creek is an Australian television series.

Five Mile Creek or Fivemile Creek may also refer to:

Fivemile Creek (Altamaha River tributary), a stream in Georgia
Fivemile Creek (Spring River), a stream in Missouri and Oklahoma
Fivemile Creek (Youngs Creek), a stream in Missouri
Fivemile Creek (Susquehanna River), a stream in New York
Fivemile Creek (East Branch Oil Creek tributary), a stream in Crawford County, Pennsylvania
Fivemile Creek (Wood County, Wisconsin), a stream in Wood and Portage counties, Wisconsin

See also
Fivemile Branch
Five Mile River (disambiguation)